Robert Gnaizda (August 6, 1936 – July 11, 2020) was the co-founder, General Counsel and Policy Director for the Greenlining Institute based in Berkeley, California. He was known as an advocate of social justice for over 40 years. 

Gnaizda was born in Brooklyn, in New York City, NY, to Samuel and Sandra (née Ackerman) Gnaizda. He was raised in the Brownsville section of the borough. After Stuyvesant High School, he was graduated from Columbia College of Columbia University in 1957 and Yale Law School in 1960; he was admitted to the California Bar on January 9, 1962.

Prior to co-founding the Greenlining Institute, he was the chief counsel for America’s first legal service program for rural families, California Rural Legal Assistance, which was founded by James D. Lorenz received numerous national awards as the most outstanding legal service program in the United States. He also was the founder and senior partner in the western United States’ first public interest law firm, Public Advocates. He served under former California Governor Jerry Brown as California's Health Director and Chief Deputy Secretary for Health, Welfare and Prisons and was the State Bar representative for the Federal Judicial Selection Committee.

Gnaizda was Statewide Litigation Director for California Rural Legal Assistance, representing with low-income and mistreated farm workers in California's Salinas Valley during the era of Cesar Chavez.

He was chief counsel in over 100 class action court and administrative cases focusing on minority economic empowerment and civil rights.  In 2009, he was recipient of The Loren Miller Legal Services Award.  The award is given annually and honors an attorney who has demonstrated long-term commitment to legal services and who has personally done significant work in extending legal services to the poor. In 2016 he received the Yale Latino Law Students Association's Alumni Award. 

In the Oscar Award-winning documentary film Inside Job (2010) by Charles H. Ferguson about the financial crisis of 2007-2010, Gnaizda "characterizes the Obama administration as 'a Wall Street government,' a take Mr. Ferguson clearly endorses."

After retiring from the Greenlining Institute, he joined National Asian American Coalition and National Diversity Coalition as their general counsel, where he worked with Faith Bautista to empower minorities in home ownership and economic development.

He died in San Francisco at the age of 83.

References

External links
 Greenlining Institute Web site

1936 births
2020 deaths
California lawyers
Columbia College (New York) alumni
Lawyers from Brooklyn
Yale Law School alumni